Fevzi Türkeri (born 1941, Elazığ) is a former Turkish general. He graduated from the Turkish Military Academy in 1962 and the Kara Harp Akademisi in 1975. During the 1980s and 1990s he was twice Chief of the Special Forces of the Turkish Army. He was General Commander of the Gendarmerie of Turkey from 26 August 2004 to 24 August 2006.

References 

1941 births
Living people
Turkish Army generals
General Commanders of the Gendarmerie of Turkey
Special Warfare Department personnel
Turkish Military Academy alumni
Commanders of the Second Army of Turkey
People from Elazığ